William Still was an abolitionist and member of the Pennsylvania Anti-Slavery Society.

William Still may also refer to:

 William Grant Still, American composer 
 William Joseph Still, English engineer
 William N. Still Jr., American maritime historian
 William Still, Australian cricketer
 William Still, Belgian professional football manager